In real analysis, a branch of mathematics, a modulus of convergence is a function that tells how quickly a convergent sequence converges.  These moduli are often employed in the study of computable analysis and constructive mathematics. 

If a sequence of real numbers  converges to a real number , then by definition, for every real  there is a natural number  such that if  then .

Definition 

Suppose that  is a convergent sequence of real numbers with limit . There are two ways of defining a modulus of convergence as a function from natural numbers to natural numbers:
 As a function  such that for all , if  then .
 As a function  such that for all , if  then .
The latter definition is often employed in constructive settings, where the limit  may actually be identified with the convergent sequence.

See also 
 Modulus of continuity

References 
 Klaus Weihrauch (2000), Computable Analysis.

Constructivism (mathematics)
Computable analysis
Real analysis